Jakob Jud [ju:t] (12 January 1882 in Wängi, Kanton Thurgau – 15 June 1952 in Seelisberg, Kanton Uri) was a Swiss Romance linguist (Romanist).

From 1922 to 1950 he taught classes in Romance philology and Old French literature at the University of Zürich. With Karl Jaberg, he was the author of Sprach- und Sachatlas Italiens und der Südschweiz (8 volumes, 1928–40). In 1936, with Arnald Steiger, he founded the magazine Vox Romanica.

He became a foreign member of the Royal Netherlands Academy of Arts and Sciences in 1946.

References 

Linguists from Switzerland
1882 births
1952 deaths
Romance philologists
Members of the Académie royale de langue et de littérature françaises de Belgique
Members of the Institute for Catalan Studies
Members of the Royal Netherlands Academy of Arts and Sciences
People from Münchwilen District
Academic staff of the University of Zurich
20th-century linguists